Léman was a department of the French First Republic and French First Empire. Its name came from the French name of Lake Geneva, Lac Léman. It was formed in 1798, when the Republic of Geneva was annexed by the French Republic. Léman also included districts that were previously part of the departments of Mont-Blanc (northern Savoy) and Ain (around Gex). Its territory corresponded with the present Swiss canton of Geneva and parts of the present French departments of Ain and Haute-Savoie.

The Chef-lieu of the department was Genève. The department was subdivided into the following three arrondissements and cantons:

 Genève: Carouge, Chêne-Thônex, Collonge, Frangy, Genève (3 cantons), Gex, Reignier and Saint-Julien.
 Bonneville: Bonneville, Chamonix, Cluses, Megève, La Roche, Sallanches, Samoëns, Taninges and Viuz-en-Sallaz.
 Thonon: Douvaine, Évian, Saint-Jean-d'Aulps and Thonon.

After the final defeat of Napoleon in 1815, the former Republic of Geneva became a Swiss canton, and Savoy was returned to the Kingdom of Sardinia. The area around Gex returned to the department of Ain.

Administration

Prefects
The Prefect was the highest state representative in the department.

Secretary-General
The Secretary-General was the deputy to the Prefect.

Subprefects of Bonneville

Subprefects of Genève
The office of Subprefect of Genève was held by the Prefect until 1811.

Subprefects of Thonon

See also
 Former departments of France
 Canton of Léman

References

Former departments of France in Switzerland
States and territories established in 1798
Former departments of France in France
States and territories disestablished in 1815
Haute-Savoie
History of Geneva
1798 establishments in France